
Uncial 0313 (in the Gregory-Aland numbering), is a Greek uncial manuscript of the New Testament. Palaeographically it has been assigned to the 5th-century.

The codex contains a small text of the Gospel of Mark 4:9.15, on one fragment of the one parchment leaf. The original size of the leaf is unknown; the surviving fragment is 10 by 2 cm.

The text is written in one column per page, and the original number of lines is unknown. The surviving fragment has only 2 lines.

Uncial 0313 is currently housed at the Christopher De Hamel Collection (Gk. Ms 3) at Corpus Christi College, Cambridge.

See also
List of New Testament uncials
Biblical manuscript
Textual criticism

References

Further reading
Peter M. Head, "Five New Testament Manuscripts: Recently Discovered Fragments in a Private Collection in Cambridge", JTS, NS, 2008.

External links
Images from 0313 at the CSNTM
"Continuation of the Manuscript List", Institute for New Testament Textual Research, University of Münster. Retrieved April 9, 2008

Greek New Testament uncials
5th-century biblical manuscripts